Jeremy Goldkorn (Pinyin: Jīn Yùmí; born in Johannesburg) is a South African-American editor who lives in Nashville, United States. He is the editor-in-chief of The China Project and co-hosts the Sinica Podcast with Kaiser Kuo. He was the founder of Danwei, a China-focused blog and media research firm. He is notable for his publications being blocked from viewing in China and for being banned from entering the country. Three consecutive publications Goldkorn launched after receiving US private funding have been blocked; 'Danwei' (2009), 'Sup China' (2019) and 'The China Project' (2022).   

He graduated from the University of Cape Town with a Bachelor of Arts (Honors) in Literature. Prior to founding Danwei, he worked for several Beijing-based magazines, including Beijing Scene, TimeOut and technology magazine ReDegg, and as business development manager for Beijing design firm Standards Group.

Danwei, which is named after the Chinese term for a work unit, is considered to be a well-read China-focused "bridge blog" that translates Chinese language media articles into English. John Lanchester has written that "Danwei gives a range of sources, news and opinions on China that no mainstream news organisation can match." Danwei has collaborated with the Australian Centre on China in the World at the Australian National University to archive China media articles for research purposes since 2010. Danwei was blocked in mainland China in 2009.

In early 2013, Goldkorn sold Danwei to the Financial Times.

Goldkorn has spoken frequently about Chinese media and Internet culture, including at the University of Sydney and Columbia Law School, and in interviews with Frontline, the Australia Network and the Asia Society. He also regularly co-hosts the Sinica current affairs podcast with Kaiser Kuo.

References

External links
Danwei website
Personal website and blog

Columns by Jeremy Goldkorn, The Guardian (2009–10)

Year of birth missing (living people)
Living people
South African writers
South African editors
South African emigrants to the United States
University of Cape Town alumni